Jason Curtis Fox (born May 2, 1988) is a former American football offensive tackle. He was drafted by the Detroit Lions in the fourth round of the 2010 NFL Draft.  He played college football at the University of Miami.

Fox has also played for the Miami Dolphins.

Early life
Fox was born and raised in Fort Worth, Texas. Miami former offensive line coach Mario Cristobal recruited him. At North Crowley High School, he played tight end during his junior year, moving to the offensive line as a senior. He was rated by Scout.com and Rivals.com as a four-star recruit.

College career
Fox decided between Miami and many Big 12 schools before deciding that he wanted to go play for the 'U', where he started at right tackle as a true freshman in the season opener against Florida State and became the starting left tackle midway through the season and held on to it for the remainder of his time at Miami.

Fox started 47 games for the Hurricanes, two away from breaking the school start mark by an offensive lineman set by Richard Mercier and Mike Sullivan (48) and three away from tying the mark regardless of position by William Joseph.

Before the start of Fox' senior year, he was selected to his first Preseason All-ACC Team.

While at the University of Miami, Fox was a member of the Pi Kappa Alpha fraternity.

Professional career

Detroit Lions
Jason Fox was seen as a developmental tackle to be groomed by long-time Detroit Lions starting left tackle Jeff Backus but saw little action due to injuries. In 2011 Fox was inactive through the first eight games, then was placed on injured reserve, ending his season. He played in one game in the 2012 season. In 2013, Fox won the starting position of right tackle taking over for the departed Gosder Cherilus. Fox started in only three games, though he played in eight.

Miami Dolphins
On April 2, 2014, Fox signed a one-year contract with the Miami Dolphins.

Post playing career
After retiring from the NFL, Fox became the founder and CEO of the social listening app, 'EarBuds'.

References

External links
Miami Dolphins bio
Detroit Lions bio
Miami Hurricanes bio

1988 births
Living people
Players of American football from Fort Worth, Texas
American football offensive tackles
Miami Hurricanes football players
Detroit Lions players
Miami Dolphins players